Agonopterix rubrovittella is a moth in the family Depressariidae. It was described by Aristide Caradja in 1926. It is found in Siberia.

References

Moths described in 1926
Agonopterix
Moths of Asia